The Monte Cinto massif is one of the main massifs in the island of Corsica, France, taking its name from the highest mountain in Corsica, Monte Cinto.
It is the northernmost and highest of the four massifs that form the spine of the island.
The massif is mostly in the Haute-Corse department, but the southwest of the massif is in the Corse-du-Sud department.

Setting
The island of Corsica essentially consists of a long chain of mountains divided into four massifs.
From north to south these are the massifs of Monte Cinto, Monte Rotondo, Monte Renoso and Monte Incudine.
The main peaks are Monte Cinto, Punta Minuta, Paglia Orba, Monte Padro, Monte Traunato, Monte Corona, Capu a u Ceppu and Monte Grosso.

The massif is bounded by the Forêt de Bonifatu and Forêt de Tartagine Melaja to the north, the Forêt de Pineto to the east and the Forêt de Valdu Niellu to the south.
It is drained by the Fango river to the west, the Tavignano to the southeast, the Golo to the east, the Asco and Tartagine to the northeast and the Figarella to the northwest.

Peaks
The main peaks are,

Gallery

See also
List of mountains in Corsica by height

Notes

Sources

Mountains of Haute-Corse
Mountains of Corse-du-Sud
Massifs of Corsica